When the Viking chieftain Rollo obtained via the Treaty of Saint-Clair-sur-Epte the territories which would later make up Normandy, he distributed them as estates among his main supporters.  Among these lands were the seigneurie of Harcourt, near Brionne, and the county of Pont-Audemer, both of which Rollo granted to Bernard the Dane, ancestor of the lords (seigneurs) of Harcourt.  The first to use Harcourt as a name, however, was Anquetil d'Harcourt at the start of the 11th century.

Lords of Harcourt

House of Harcourt
 c.911–c.950 : Bernard the Dane, governor and regent of the duchy of Normandy in 943
 married Sprote, princess of Bourgogne
 c.950–c.960 : Torf le Riche, baron de Tourville, son of Bernard
 married Ertemberge de Bricquebec
 c.960–c.1020 : Turquetil 
 married Anceline de Montfort-sur-Risle
 c.1020 – aft. 1066 : Anquetil d'Harcourt, son of Turquetil
 married Ève de Boissey
 aft. 1066 – aft. 1078 : Errand d'Harcourt, son of Anquetil
married Emme d'Estouteville
 aft. 1078 – aft. 1100 : Robert I of Harcourt, Brother of Errand
married Colette d'Argouges.
 aft. 1100 – aft. 1124 : William of Harcourt, son of Robert I
married Hue d'Amboise.

 aft. 1124–1212 : Robert II of Harcourt, seigneur d'Elbeuf, son of William
married Jeanne de Meulan in 1179
 1212–1239 : Richard, Baron of Harcourt  (d. 1239), son of Robert II
married Jeanne de la Roche-Tesson, heiress of the Viscount of Saint-Sauveur, in 1213
 1239–1288 : John I of Harcourt (1199–1288), son of Richard
married Alix de Beaumont
 1288–1302 : John II of Harcourt (1240–1302), marshal and admiral of France, son of John I
married first Agnès de Lorraine, daughter of Frederick III, Duke of Lorraine
married second Jeanne de Châtellerault
 1302–1329 : John III of Harcourt (d. 1329), son of John II and Jeanne de Châtellerault
married Alix de Reginar, daughter of Godfrey of Brabant.

Counts of Harcourt 
The barony of Harcourt was erected into the county of Harcourt, together with the seigneuries of Lillebonne, Troispierres, La Saussaye and Elbeuf, by letters patent of Philip VI in March 1338.

House of Harcourt

 1329–1346 : John IV (d. 1346), Count of Harcourt in 1338, son of John III
married Isabeau de Parthenay, dame de Vibraye, de Montfort-le-Rotrou, d'Aspremont and de Bonnétable
 1346–1356 : John V (d. 5 April 1356, Rouen), son of John IV
married Blanche de Ponthieu, Countess of Aumale, sister of Joan of Ponthieu, Dame of Epernon 
 1355–1389 : John VI (1342–1389), son of John V
married Catherine de Bourbon (d. 1427), daughter of Peter I, Duke of Bourbon, in 1359
 1389–1452 : John VII (1370–1452), son of John VI
married Marie d'Alençon (1373–1417), daughter of Pierre II, Count of Alençon, in 1390

His only son, John VIII, was killed in battle in 1424. Upon the death of John VII in 1452, his inheritance was to be divided between his elder daughter, Marie, wife of Antoine, Count of Vaudémont, and his second daughter, Jeanne, wife of Jean III de Rieux. However, Marie and her son John of Vaudémont were able to control the entire inheritance until 1454, when the de Rieux gained control of the County of Aumale. However, litigation continued between the de Rieux and the Vaudémont-Lorraine through the late 15th century.

House of Vaudémont-Lorraine

 1454–1476 : Marie, Countess of Harcourt, daughter of John VII, with:
 her husband Antoine, Count of Vaudémont 1454–1458
 her son John of Vaudémont 1458–1473
 her grandson René II, Duke of Lorraine 1473–1476
 1476–1495 : René II, Duke of Lorraine

House of Rieux

The de Rieux continued to maintain their claims on Harcourt. Jeanne (1399–1456), the daughter of John VII, had married Jean III de Rieux (1377–1431) in 1414. She was succeeded by her son François de Rieux (1418–1458), who married Jeanne de Rohan in 1442 and was succeeded by his son Jean IV de Rieux. He reached a settlement with the Duke of Lorraine in 1495, trading Aumale for Harcourt, and resumed the title.

 1495–1518 : Jean IV de Rieux (1447–1518), son of François
married Isabelle de Brosse (died 1527), daughter of John VI, Count of Penthièvre
 1518–1532 : Claude de Rieux (1497–1532), son of Jean IV
married Suzanne de Bourbon-Montpensier (died 1570), daughter of Louis de Bourbon, Prince de La Roche-sur-Yon and Louise de Montpensier
 1532–1557 : Henri de Rieux (died 1557), son of Claude, died without issue

Upon the death of Henri, the county of Harcourt passed to his sister Louise, who had married René, Marquis of Elbeuf, head of a cadet branch of the House of Lorraine.

House of Lorraine

 1557–1570 : Louise de Rieux (1531–1570), sister of Henri
married René, Marquis of Elbeuf (1536–1566) in 1555
1566–1605 : Charles I, Duke of Elbeuf (1556–1605), son of René
married Marguerite de Chabot (1565–1652) in 1583
 1605–1666 : Henri, Count of Harcourt (1601–1666), younger son of Charles I

 1666–1694 : François Louis, Count of Harcourt, (1627–1694), nephew of Henri, son of Charles II, Duke of Elbeuf
 married Anne d'Ornano (died 1695) in 1645
 1694–1718 : Alphonse Henri, Count of Harcourt (1648–1718), styled the prince d'Harcourt, son of François Louis
married  Marie Françoise de Brancas (died 1715) in 1667
 1719–1739 : Joseph, Count of Harcourt (1679–1739), styled the prince d'Harcourt, son of Alphonse
married Marie Louise Chrétienne Jeannin de Castille (1680–1736) in 1705
 1739–1747 : Louis Marie Léopold de Lorraine (1720–1747), styled the prince d'Harcourt, son of Joseph

Modern titles 
"Harcourt" has been given as a title to descendants of cadet branches of the family of Harcourt, without a territorial connection to the medieval county. Both branches descend from Philippe d'Harcourt (1353–1403), Lord of Bonnétable, son of John V of Harcourt.

Dukes of Harcourt 
The title of duc d'Harcourt was granted in 1700 by Louis XIV to Henry d'Harcourt (1654–1718), marshal of France, of the branch of Beuvron, upon the erection of the marquisate de La Mothe and de Thury to a duchy, with the name of Harcourt. The title was made a peerage in 1709, by letters patent.

 1700–1718 : Henry d'Harcourt (1654–1718), duc d'Harcourt, marshal of France
married Marie Anne Claude de Brulart de Genlis (1669–1750) in 1687
 1700–1750 : François (1689–1750), duc d'Harcourt, marshal of France, son of Henry
married Marguerite Sophie Louise de Neufville (1699–1716) in 1716, then in 1717 Marie Madeleine Le Tellier (1697–1735)
 1750–1783 : Anne Pierre d'Harcourt (1701–1783), duc d'Harcourt, marshal of France, brother of François
married Eulalie de Beaupoil de Sainte-Aulaire (1715–1738) in 1725
 1783–1802 : François-Henri d'Harcourt (1726–1802), duc d'Harcourt, son of Anne
married Françoise Cathérine d'Aubusson de la Feuillade (1733–1815) in 1752
 1802–1839 : Marie François (1755–1839), duc d'Harcourt, nephew of François-Henri
married Madeleine Jacqueline Le Veneur de Tillières (died 1825) in 1780
 1839–1840 : Alphonse Aymar François (1785–1840), duc d'Harcourt, son of Marie
 1840–1846 : François Eugène Gabriel (1786–1865), duc d'Harcourt, brother of Alphonse
married Aglaé Terray (1788–1867) in 1807
 Henri Marie Nicolas (1808–1846), marquis d'Harcourt, son of François (predeceased his father)
married Slanie de Choiseul-Praslin (1807–1843) in 1829
 1846–1895 : Charles François Marie (1835–1895), duc d'Harcourt, son of Henri
married Marie (1843–1916), comtesse de Mercy-Argenteau, in 1862
 1895–1908 : Henri Eugène François Marie (1864–1908), duc d'Harcourt, son of Charles
married Marie de la Rochefoucauld (1871–1952) in 1892
 1908–1997 : Charles Jean Marie (1902–1997), duc d'Harcourt, son of Henri
married Antoinette Gérard (1909–1958) in 1927, then in 1961 Maria Teresa de Zayas (born 1930)
 1997-2020 : François Henri (1928-2020), duc d'Harcourt, son of Charles
married Isabelle Roubeau (1961-)
 2020-present : Geoffroy (1952-), duc d'Harcourt, cousin of François
married Hélène de Nicolay (1962-)